Claudius Schraudolph the Elder (2 October 1813 - 13 November 1891) was a German history painter, lithographer and woodcut artist.

Life
Born in Oberstdorf, he was brother to Johann and Matthias and uncle to Johann's son Claudius Schraudolph the Younger. He studied in the studio of Heinrich Maria von Hess and thanks to him was able aged only 19 to attend Munich's new Academy of Fine Arts, founded in 1831. Maximilian II Joseph of Bavaria's will later enabled Claudius to travel to Italy to study fresco-painting techniques with Joseph Anton Fischer, another painter.

After returning to Munich he there collaborated with Johann on the fresco cycle in the All Saints' Chapel of the Munich Residenz, and assisted him in frescoes for Speyer Cathedral. He also painted frescoes in the Residenz zu Athen. After Johann's death in 1879, Claudius returned home and painted several regional churches, along with the painted façade of Munich's Hotel Königshof in 1880. He died in Oberstdorf.

Bibliography

External links (in German)
 Oberstdorf-Online: Claudius Schraudolph der Ältere
 Akademie der Bildenden Künste München: Claudius Schraudolph der Ältere in der Matrikeldatenbank

19th-century German painters
19th-century German male artists
1813 births
1891 deaths
People from Oberstdorf
German lithographers
German printmakers
Nazarene painters
German male painters